The United States Senate Vice Presidential Bust Collection is a series of 46 busts in the United States Capitol, each one bearing the likenesses of a vice president of the United States. Each sculpture, from John Adams to Dick Cheney, honors the role of the vice president as both a member of the executive branch and as president of the Senate.

The Joint Committee on the Library, acting under a resolution of May 13, 1886, was the first to commission busts of the vice presidents to occupy the niches in the new Senate Chamber. After the first 20 busts filled the niches surrounding the Chamber, later additions were placed throughout the Senate wing of the Capitol. The collection is incomplete, since the busts of former vice presidents Joe Biden and Mike Pence are in the process of being created. The bust of Kamala Harris will not be commissioned until she leaves office.

List of busts

Notes

References

United States Capitol art
Art museums and galleries in Washington, D.C.
Sculpture gardens, trails and parks in the United States
Vice presidency of the United States
Busts in Washington, D.C.